Chen Shaokun (20 April 1921 - 10 October 2020) was a Chinese army officer and politician who served as minister of Metallurgical Industry from 1975 to 1977. Prior to that, he was director of Political Department of Shenyang Military Region between 1969 and 1970 and deputy political commissar of Shenyang Military Region between 1969 and 1975.

Biography
Chen was born in Suyu District of Suqian, Jiangsu, on April 20, 1921. After graduating from Suqian High School, he was admitted to Counter-Japanese Military and Political University. He enlisted in the Eighth Route Army in 1939, and joined the Communist Party of China in 1940.

Second Sino-Japanese War
In 1940, he served in Sishu County as party chief and deputy captain of guerrilla force. After that, he became director of Politieal Division of the New 1st Group Army.

Chinese Civil War
He participated in the 1948 Battle of Jinzhou attacks led by Lin Biao and Luo Ronghuan in northeast China's Liaoning province. He also participated in the Pingjin campaign, Yangtze River Crossing Campaign, and Guangdong-Guangxi campaign.

Korean War
After the outbreak of the Korean War, he was commissioned director of Political Department of the 116th Division of the 39th Group Army. His army overwhelmed the 8th Regiment of the 1st Cavalry Division of the United States Army during the Battle of Unsan. In 1952, he became deputy political commissar of the 117th Division, and in 1953 received a promotion to political commissar of 115th Division.

After returning to China, he became political commissar of 116th Division in 1954. In 1962, he was director of Political Department, deputy political commissar, and then political commissar of the 39th Group Army. He was promoted to the rank of major general (Shaojiang) in 1964. In 1969, he was transferred to Shenyang Military Region and appointed deputy political commissar and director of Political Department. He retired in 1977.

Death
He died in Beijing on October 10, 2020, aged 99.

Personal life
He married Yang Jingyuan. Their son,  (born 1955), is also a major general (Shaojiang) in the People's Liberation Army (PLA) of China.

Work

Awards
 National Flag Medal (1952)
 Order of Freedom and Independence (2nd Class Medal) (1952)
 Order of Independence and Freedom (2nd Class Medal) (1955)
 Order of Liberation (2nd Class Medal) (1955)

References

1921 births
2020 deaths
People from Suqian
People's Republic of China politicians from Jiangsu
Chinese Communist Party politicians from Jiangsu
People's Liberation Army generals from Jiangsu
People of the Chinese Civil War
Chinese military personnel of World War II
Chinese military personnel of the Korean War